Nigger Jack may refer to:
Nigger Jack, a nickname of John J. Pershing
Nigger Jack Slough, a former name of Jack Slough, a stream in California